William Ross Tetley (July 11, 1933 – June 9, 2003) was a Canadian curler. He was the skip of the 1975 Brier Champion team, representing Northern Ontario. The team later went on to finish third at the World Championships of that year. He is the father of curler Ian Tetley.

He also skipped Northern Ontario to a 6-5 record at the 1995 Canadian Senior Curling Championships, missing the playoffs.

References

External links
 
 William Tetley – Curling Canada Stats Archive

1933 births
2003 deaths
Brier champions
Canadian male curlers
Curlers from Northern Ontario
People from Bruce County